The 2006 FIFA Club World Cup (officially known as the FIFA Club World Cup Japan 2006 presented by Toyota for sponsorship reasons) was a football tournament held in Japan between 10 and 17 December 2006. It was the third FIFA Club World Cup.

The club champions from each of the six confederations played in a knockout tournament. The quarter-final match-ups were determined by a draw including the AFC, CAF, CONCACAF and OFC champions, while the UEFA and CONMEBOL champions were given byes to the semi-finals. The losers of the quarter-finals would play for the fifth place, while the losers of the semi-finals were to play in a third-place play-off.

Defending champions São Paulo were beaten in the 2006 Copa Libertadores Finals by fellow Brazilian side Internacional, who went on to win the Club World Cup for the first time, beating Al Ahly in the semi-finals before defeating Spanish club Barcelona 1–0 in the final.

A team from the host nation did not participate, as was initially proposed. Following the departure of Australia from the OFC, the Oceanian representative, Auckland City, was fully amateur, so forcing them to play a play-off for a place in the quarter-finals against the J. League champions (Gamba Osaka) was considered, which would have also promoted local interest. The change would have also eliminated the fifth-place play-off, to keep the number of games intact. This was finally rejected, but the tournament format was changed for 2007.

Qualified teams

Venues
Tokyo, Yokohama and Toyota were the three cities to serve as venues for the 2006 FIFA Club World Cup.

Match officials

Squads
For a list of all the rosters of this tournament, see the article 2006 FIFA Club World Cup squads.

Matches

All times Japan Standard Time (UTC+09:00)

Quarter-finals

Semi-finals

Match for fifth place

Match for third place

Final

Goalscorers

Awards

References

External links
FIFA Club World Cup Japan 2006, FIFA.com
2006 FIFA Club World Cup Official Site (Archived)
FIFA Technical Report

 
2006
2006
2006 in association football
2006 in Brazilian football
2006 in South Korean football
2006–07 in Spanish football
2006–07 in Egyptian football
2006–07 in Mexican football
2006–07 in New Zealand association football